St James' Church is an 18th-century chapel situated in the grounds of Packington Hall, near Meriden, Warwickshire. It is a Grade I listed building.

The church was built in 1789 to a design by architect Joseph Bonomi for the Earl of Aylesford as a private family chapel. It is said to commemorate the recovery of George III from insanity.

The red brick church, in neo-classical style, has an unusual square plan with four corner turrets topped with domes and finials.

It houses an organ built by Thomas Parker, to specifications outlined by Handel in 1749, for his librettist Charles Jennens.  Jennens'  home Gopsall Hall, has not survived, but the organ passed to his relatives the Earls of Aylesford. The instrument was filmed and recorded for the documentary The Elusive English Organ.

References

  A History of the County of Warwick, Volume 4 (1947) pp180-183 from British History Online

Grade I listed churches in Warwickshire
18th-century Church of England church buildings
Church of England church buildings in Warwickshire